George L. Ackerman (1905 – August 9, 1971) was an American football and baseball coach. He served as the head football coach at Trenton State College—now known as The College of New Jersey—from 1946 to 1956. He also served as TCNJ's head baseball coach.

References

External links
 

1905 births
1971 deaths
TCNJ Lions athletic directors
TCNJ Lions baseball coaches
TCNJ Lions football coaches
Springfield College (Massachusetts) alumni
Players of American football from Paterson, New Jersey